Spensa Technologies was a private company based in the Purdue Research Park in West Lafayette, Indiana that specialized in precision agriculture. The company, founded in 2009, was known for its ag-related technology, including automated pest sensors and software. It was acquired in April 2018 by DTN.

History
Spensa was founded on 16 January 2009 by Johnny Park, a computer engineering professor at Purdue University, whose research into robotics and computer vision in farming (supported by a $6.4M USDA grant) led to the creation of the company. With support from the National Science Foundation and private investment, Spensa expanded its operations and developed agriculture-related hardware and software products.

Spensa's principal hardware product was the Z-Trap, an automated electronic device that detects insects in a field and wirelessly reports its data. Its software consisted of both web-based and mobile applications, centered on the Spensa Agronomic Platform (AP), a subscription-based software.

Spensa was acquired in April 2018 by Minneapolis-based DTN, a company owned by TBG AG.

References

Agriculture companies of the United States
Privately held companies based in Indiana
Technology companies established in 2009
West Lafayette, Indiana